The Agricultural University of Tirana is a public university located in Tirana, Albania. It offers education in agronomy, veterinary, forestry, ecology, agribusiness, and similar subjects.

History

AUT was created in 1951. It was first called "High Institute of Agriculture". It received its current name in 1991.

Today it is the unique centre in Albania for undergraduate and graduate studies, scientific research, training and extension in the area of agriculture and food (Agronomy, Horticulture and Plant Protection, Agribusiness, Economy and Agrarian Policy, Environment and Natural Resources, Agro-food Technology, Animal Husbandry and Business, Aquaculture and Fishery Management, Forestry Engineering, Veterinary Medicine, etc.

Academics and size
Every year around 15.000 students start their studies at the Agricultural University of Tirana. The actual academic staff is composed of 55 professors, 48 associated professors, 55 doctors, 13 pedagogues – lecturers and 64 assistants.

Faculties and departments
AUT includes the following faculties:

 Faculty of Agriculture and Environment ("Fakulteti i Bujqësisë dhe Mjedisit")
 Faculty of Economy and Agribusiness ("Fakulteti i Ekonomisë dhe Agrobiznesit")
 Faculty of Forest Sciences ("Fakulteti i Shkencave Pyjore ") 
 Faculty of Veterinary Medicine ("Fakulteti i Mjekësisë Veterinare ") 
 Faculty of Biotechnology and Food ("Fakulteti i Bioteknologjisë dhe Ushqimit")

Notable professors
 Pirro Dodbiba
 Mentor Përmeti
 Niko Qafzezi
 Andrea Shundi
 Myqerem Tafaj

See also
 List of universities in Albania
 Quality Assurance Agency of Higher Education
 List of colleges and universities
 List of colleges and universities by country
Agriculture in Albania

Sources

 
Universities in Albania
Educational institutions established in 1951
Universities and colleges in Tirana
1951 establishments in Albania
Agricultural universities and colleges in Albania